Nucleoporin 43 (Nup43) is a protein that in humans is encoded by the NUP43 gene.

Bidirectional transport of macromolecules between the cytoplasm and nucleus occurs through nuclear pore complexes (NPCs) embedded in the nuclear envelope. NPCs are composed of subcomplexes, and NUP43 is part of one such subcomplex, Nup107-160 (Loiodice et al., 2004).[supplied by OMIM] Along with other nucleoporins.

Structure
It folds into a canonical WD40 repeat domain.

Disease association 

High expression of NUP43 in breast cancer is associated with poor overall survival. In chronic myelogenous leukemia (CML), reduction of miRNA-409-5p increases the expression of NUP43 that in turn enhances proliferative potential, cell cycle progression, and  imatinib resistance.

Some Nup43 variants have been characterized as causal for the onset of cardiovascular disease (CVD), while Nup43 expression has been associated with attention deficit hyperactivity disorder.

References

Further reading

External links 
 

Nuclear pore complex